Russell Ash (18 June 1946 – 21 June 2010) was the British author of the Top 10 of Everything series of books, as well as Great Wonders of the World, Incredible Comparisons and many other reference, art and humour titles, most notably his series of books on strange-but-true names, Potty, Fartwell & Knob, Busty, Slag and Nob End and (for children) Big Pants, Burpy and Bumface.  Once described as 'the human Google', his obituary in The Times stated that 'In the age of the internet, it takes tenacity and idiosyncratic intelligence to make a living from purveying trivial information.  Russell Ash did just that'.

Biography
Russell Ash was born in Surrey, a descendant of a family of craftsmen – goldsmiths and silversmiths in 18th-century London that included Claudius Ash (1792–1854), one of the pioneering inventors of false teeth. His father worked as a bookbinder for the British Museum Library and also served in the RAF in the Second World War.

The family moved to Bedford, where he attended primary school and Bedford Modern School. He studied anthropology and geography at St Cuthbert's Society, Durham University, and began a publishing career in 1967. He worked as a picture researcher for Man, Myth & Magic and a researcher/writer for Reader's Digest Books and as European Correspondent for Newsweek Books on their Wonders of Man series.

In 1973, with his friend Ian Grant, Russell Ash established the publishing company Ash & Grant, that ran for five years. He was also a director of Weidenfeld & Nicolson in 1980–83, where he worked with authors including comedian Barry Humphries (a.k.a. Dame Edna Everage), and Pavilion Books in 1984–88, where he published works by satirist John Wells, Hockney Posters and numerous other illustrated books. However, his principal occupation was that of freelance author, having written or contributed to over a hundred non-fiction books.
He was married to Caroline Ash, fundraiser with the Malaria Consortium, and has a daughter and two sons.

Death
He lived in Lewes, East Sussex, from 1991 until his death from a heart attack.

Work
Russell Ash wrote for both adults and children on a diverse range of subjects, including reference, art, history, biography and humour. 'Top 10 of Everything', probably his best-known work, has been published annually since 1989 and was the basis of a children's TV series broadcast on ITV in 1998–2001. Related books – The Top 10 of Sport, The Top 10 of Music, The Top 10 of Film, Top 10 for Men, Top 10 of Britain and others – have been issued at intervals. Formerly published by Dorling Kindersley, Top 10 of Everything has been published by Hamlyn since 2006 and also appears in a number of translations.

The art books Russell Ash wrote during the 1990s include titles on the Pre-Raphaelites, the Impressionists and their contemporaries: Sir Lawrence Alma-Tadema, Henri de Toulouse-Lautrec, James Tissot, Sir Edward Burne-Jones, Dante Gabriel Rossetti, Lord Leighton and Sir John Everett Millais.

He compiled a range of illustrated information books for children, including Incredible Comparisons (1996), The World in One Day (1997), The Factastic Book of 1001 Lists (1998), Factastic Millennium Facts (1999) and Great Wonders of the World (2000), all of which were published by Dorling Kindersley and internationally in numerous editions.

He was the co-author (with Brian Lake) of Fish Who Answer the Telephone and Other Bizarre Books (2006). Among his other publications are Whitaker's World of Facts (annual 2005–; published in North America as Firefly's World of Facts), Potty, Fartwell & Knob: Extraordinary but True Names of British People (2007; expanded paperback 2008; US edition as Morecock, Fartwell, & Hoare, 2009), Busty, Slag and Nob End (2009) and Big Pants, Burpy and Bumface (2009).

He was a contributor to a number of annual publications, including Whitaker's Almanack and Children's Writers' & Artists' Yearbook and an occasional journalist, who contributed articles to various British national newspapers.

On 7 April 2008, he took part in BBC2's University Challenge: The Professionals, in the team representing the Society of Authors, which also comprised Antony Beevor (captain), Katie Fforde and Anna Claybourne.

Bibliography

Art
 Alma-Tadema (1973) 
 Alma-Tadema (catalogue of the Funt Collection) (1973)
 Victorian Studio Photographs (with Bevis Hillier et al.) (1975) 
 The Impressionists and their Art (1980) 
 Selections from the Reader's Digest Collection (1986)
 Sir Lawrence Alma-Tadema (1989) 
 Toulouse-Lautrec: The Complete Posters (1991) 
 The Impressionists’ River (1992) 
 Van Gogh's Provence (1992) 
 James Tissot (1992) 
 Sir Edward Burne-Jones (1993) 
 Dante Gabriel Rossetti (1995) 
 Impressionists' Seasons (1995) 
 Lord Leighton (1995) 
 Sir John Everett Millais (1996) 
 Victorian Masters and their Art (1999)

Biography and history
 Highwaymen (1970) 
 Britain's Buried Treasures (1972) 
 Wrecks & Sunken Treasure (1972) 
 Comets (with Ian Grant) (1973) 
 The Wright Brothers (1974) 
 Dear Cats: The Post Office Letters (1986) 
 Highwaymen (revised edition) (1994) 
 Great Wonders of the World (2000)

Humour
 Dead Funny (with Ian Grant) (1974) 
 The Cynic's Dictionary (1984) 
 The Official British Yuppie Handbook (1984) 
 Last Laughs (with Ian Grant) (1984) 
 Bizarre Books (with Brian Lake) (1985) 
 Howlers (1985) 
 They Didn't Really Mean It (1987) 
 I'll Drink to That (1987, with Bernard Higton) 
 Private Parts (1987, with Bernard Higton) 
 The Uncensored Boy's Own (1990, as 'Dick Beresford') 
 The Uncensored Guide to the Movies (1991, as 'Dick Beresford') 
 Henry & Caroline at Home (with Joanna Isles) (1990) 
 Tall Stories (1994) 
 Bizarre Books (with Brian Lake; new edition) (1998) 
 Fish Who Answer the Telephone and other Bizarre Books (with Brian Lake) (2006) 
 Potty, Fartwell & Knob (2007) ; expanded paperback (2008) ; US (as Morecock, Fartwell, & Hoare) (2009) 
 Busty, Slag and Nob End (2009) 
 Big Pants, Burpy and Bumface (2009) 
 It Just Slipped Out... A Bulging Encyclopedia of double entendres (2010) .

Literature and language
 The Vampyre: A Tale by John William Polidori (introduction) (1974) 
 Edward Lear's Book of Nonsense (introduction) (1980) 
 Alice's Adventures Under Ground (Lewis Carroll; introduction) (1985) 
 The Life and Times of Paddington Bear (with Michael Bond) (1988) 
 Larkrise to Candleford Diary (1989)
 A Dictionary of RAF Slang (Eric Partridge; introduction) (1990) 

Reference and trivia
 Fact or Fiction? (1973) 
 Talking about the Family (1973) 
 Talking about Race (1974) 
 The Pig Book (1985) 
 The Londoner's Almanac (1985) 
 The Frog Book (1986) 
 The Daily Trivia Diary '87 (1986)
 Top 10 of Everything (annual; 1989–2009)  (UK);  (US) (latest edition)
 The Top 10 of Sport (with Ian Morrison) (1992) 
 The Top 10 of Music (with Luke Crampton and Barry Lazell) (1993) 
 Top 10 Quiz Book (1996) 
 Incredible Comparisons (1996) 
 Crucial Top 10 (1997) 
 The World in One Day (1997) 
 Factastic Book of 1001 Lists (1998) 
 Factastic Book of Comparisons (1999) 
 Factastic Millennium Facts (1999) 
 The Top 10 of Sport (with Ian Morrison; new edition) (2002) 
 The Top 10 of Film (2003) 
 Whitaker's World of Facts (annual; 2005–2008)  (UK); US (as Firefly's Book of Facts)  (latest edition)
 Top 10 for Men (2008) 
 Top 10 of Britain (2009) 
 Top 10 of Football'' (with Ian Morrison) (2010)

See also

 List of non-fiction writers

External links
 Top 10 of Everything collectors’ website
 Whitaker’s World of Facts website
 Potty, Fartwell & Knob website
 Busty, Slag and Nob End website
 Times Educational Supplement interview with Russell Ash by Michael Thorn
 Independent interview with Russell Ash by Nicholas Tucker
 Guardian feature on Russell Ash by Juliet Rix
 Independent article containing references to Russell Ash by Boyd Tonkin

References

1946 births
2010 deaths
Alumni of St Cuthbert's Society, Durham
British non-fiction writers
People educated at Bedford Modern School
People from Lewes
British male writers
Male non-fiction writers